Christof is a masculine given name. It is a German variant of Christopher. Notable people with the name include:

Christof Babatz (born 1974), German former professional footballer
Christof Duffner (born 1971), German former ski jumper
Christof Ebert (born 1964), German computer scientist and entrepreneur 
Christof Heyns, South African academic 
Christof Innerhofer (born 1984), Italian alpine ski racer
Christof Koch (born 1956),  American neuroscientist
Christof Lauer (born 1953), German saxophonist
Christof Lindenmayer (born 1977), American former soccer player
Christof Marselis, (1670s – 1731), Polish-Dutch architect   
Christof Mauch, German historian 
Christof Migone, Swiss-born experimental sound artist and writer 
Christof Perick (born Christof Prick, 1946), German conductor
Christof Plümacher or Christof Pluemacher (born 1963), German photographer
Christof Putzel, American journalist 
Christof Schwaller (born 1966), Swiss curler
Christof Unterberger (born 1970), Austrian cellist and composer
Christof Wandratsch (born 1966), German swimmer 
Christof Wetterich (born 1952), German theoretical physicist

See also
Christoph (disambiguation)
Christophe (disambiguation)

German masculine given names